Jaroslav Beláň (born 21 May 1981 in Bojnice) is a retired Slovak football goalkeeper. His last clubs were MFK Ružomberok, Bohemians Prague.

References

External links
  Profile at iDNES.cz

1981 births
Living people
Slovak footballers
Association football goalkeepers
SK Dynamo České Budějovice players
FK Baník Most players
FK Chmel Blšany players
MFK Ružomberok players
FK Bohemians Prague (Střížkov) players
FK Baník Sokolov players
Slovak Super Liga players
Czech First League players
Sportspeople from Bojnice
Expatriate footballers in the Czech Republic